Idorsia is a Swiss pharmaceutical research company in Allschwil, near Basel, Switzerland. After Actelion was bought by Johnson & Johnson in 2017, the Actelion founders, Jean-Paul and Martine Clozel, started their new business, located just across the road from the Actelion headquarters. The company expects to be profitable in 2025.

Products 
Table current as of May 2, 2022, listing the drugs that have reached at least phase 3 trials.

References 

Pharmaceutical companies of Switzerland
Swiss companies established in 2017